The Daimler DB18 is an automobile produced by Daimler from 1939 until 1953. It is a 2½-litre version of the preceding 2.2-litre New Fifteen introduced in 1937. From 1949, the DB18 was revised to become the Daimler Consort.

Using the engine developed for the Daimler Scout Car, it was offered to customers from 1939 as a six-cylinder chassis on which Daimler and various British coach builders offered a range of bodies including drop-head coupes.

Development
The model was introduced immediately before the Second World War, during which the company concentrated on the manufacture of military vehicles.

To contemporaries the model was generally known as the Daimler 2½-litre until Daimler adopted the North American habit of giving their cars names (although not on any badgework), and an all-steel export version of the car was introduced in October 1948 at the London Motor Show, "principally for export" and branded as the Daimler Consort. The updates included the integration of the firewall into the body rather than it being part of the chassis, a move from rod operated mechanical brakes to a Girling-Bendix hydraulic front and rod operated rear system, incorporating the head lights into the front guards, and providing a badge plate behind the front bumper with a curved radiator grille replacing the flat one.

Specification
The car used a 2,522 cc in-line six-cylinder, pushrod OHV engine fed by a single SU carburetter. By the standards of the time the car was brisker than it looked.

The car was supplied with the Daimler Fluid Flywheel coupled to a 4-speed Wilson Pre-selector gearbox. The independent front suspension used coil springs, while the back axle was suspended using a traditional semi-elliptical set-up. The chassis was "underslung" at the rear with the main chassis members passing below the rear axle. In mid-1950 the restricted ground clearance was improved by the adoption of a conventional hypoid bevel drive to the rear axle replacing the traditional Daimler underslung worm drive which had hampered sales outside Britain.

Coachwork
Although offered originally as a chassis only model, post-war the most common version was a four-door saloon which Daimler themselves produced. The interior was fitted out with traditional "good taste" using mat leather and polished wood fillets. By the early 1950s, this coachwork was beginning to look unfashionably upright and "severe yet dignified".

In 1939, Winston Churchill commissioned Carlton Carriage Co to build a drophead coupe on a DB18 chassis, chassis No.49531. He used it during election campaigns in the later 1940s.

Production
Approximately 1,000 DB18s and 25 DB18 Special Sports were produced to 1940. In addition 3,355 DB18s, 608 DB18 Sports Specials and 4,250 DB18 Consorts were built in the post-war years.

The Consort became a popular car among the wealthy in India. All together, over 100 cars were ordered, mainly by the Maharajas in India and a further dozen were ordered by Royalty in Ceylon and Burma.

Photos of exterior and interior
(Example: Daimler New Fifteen)

Gallery

References 

This entry includes statistical information from the German Wikipedia concerning the Daimler Motor Company.

External links

 Brochure 1946

Consort
Cars introduced in 1939
1940s cars
1950s cars